Bransford Road railway station was a station in Bransford, Worcestershire, England. The station was opened in 1860 and closed on 5 April 1965. The original station was replaced in 1911 by a standard GWR design with most facilities on the "up" platform.

The goods yard was closed in 1964.

References

Further reading

Disused railway stations in Worcestershire
Railway stations in Great Britain opened in 1860
Railway stations in Great Britain closed in 1965
Former Great Western Railway stations
Beeching closures in England